Hertford Rugby Football Club is an English rugby union team based in Ware, Hertfordshire. The club runs five senior sides, the full range of junior teams and a women's section which includes three women's teenage teams. The first XV currently plays in London & South East Premier.

History
Hertford Rugby Football Club was formed in 1932 as Old Hertfordians by a group of enthusiasts from Hertford Grammar School (now Richard Hale School). The club played at six venues until moving to their present location at Hoe Lane in 1949. In 1972 the club adopted their present name of Hertford RFC.

Honours
 Hertfordshire Presidents' Cup winners (9): 1981, 1982, 1986, 2004, 2005, 2006, 2007, 2008, 2011
 London 3 North West champions (3): 1994–95, 1999–00, 2000–01
 London 2 North champions: 2001–02 
 Powergen  Intermediate Cup Champions: 2003
 National League 3 (south-east v south-west) promotion play-off winners (2): 2003–04, 2010–11

References

External links
 Official website

English rugby union teams
Rugby clubs established in 1932
Rugby union clubs in Hertfordshire
Ware, Hertfordshire
1932 establishments in England